The Palerang Council was a local government area located in the Southern Tablelands region of New South Wales, Australia. On 12 May 2016 the Minister for Local Government announced dissolution of the Palerang Council with immediate effect. Together with Queanbeyan City the combined council areas were merged to establish the Queanbeyan-Palerang Regional Council. Both councils had opposed the amalgamation. Elections for the new Council area were held in September 2017. The former mayor of Queanbeyan City Council was appointed by the New South Wales Government as administrator until that date.

The last mayor of the Palerang Council was Cr. Pete Harrison, an independent politician.

Municipal history
Originally known as the Eastern Capital City Regional Council, Palerang was proclaimed on 11 February 2004 when Tallaganda Shire was amalgamated with most of Yarrowlumla Shire and small parts of Cooma-Monaro Shire, Gunning Shire and Mulwaree Shire.

A 2015 review of local government boundaries recommended that the Palerang Council merge with adjoining councils. The New South Wales Government considered three options. The alternative, proposed by Palerang Council on 29 January 2016, was for an amalgamation of the whole of Palerang with Queanbeyan City Council. On 12 May 2016 the Minister for Local Government announced dissolution of the Palerang Council with immediate effect. Together with Queanbeyan City the combined council areas were merged to establish the Queanbeyan-Palerang Regional Council.

Towns and localities
The former area was named after Mount Palerang, located close to the geographical centre, and one of the highest points in the former council's area. The area that was covered under administration extended to Lake George in the north, the Tallaganda State Forest in the south, Queanbeyan to the west and the Morton and Budawang National Parks to the east. The Kings Highway and the Sydney-Canberra railway pass through the former Palerang Council area.

Predominantly rural in nature, the Palerang Council area comprised the towns of Bungendore, Braidwood and Captains Flat, and the villages of Araluen, Majors Creek, Mongarlowe and Nerriga. It also encompasses the rural residential areas of Wamboin, Bywong, Burra, Urila, Hoskinstown, Rossi and parts of Carwoola, Royalla, and Sutton.

Around two-thirds of the Palerang population was concentrated in Bungendore and the rural residential areas adjacent to the Australian Capital Territory border, with many residents commuting daily to Canberra or Queanbeyan. Cattle grazing is the primary agricultural pursuit in the former area, with more recent development of niche rural industries such as vineyards, olive groves and alpaca breeding. About one quarter of the former Palerang Council area is managed for conservation, with significant areas of national park.

Council

Current composition and election method
Until its dissolution, Palerang Council was composed of nine councillors elected proportionally as one entire ward. All councillors were elected for a fixed four-year term of office. The mayor was elected by the councillors at the first meeting of the council. The most recent and last election was held on 8 September 2012, and the makeup of the former council was as follows:

The last council, elected in 2012 and dissolved in 2016, in order of election, was:

References

External links 
Map of council area
Palerang Council website
Palerang Community Profile
The District Bulletin
The Braidwood Times Newspaper
The Bungendore Mirror Newspaper

Former local government areas of New South Wales
Southern Tablelands
2016 disestablishments in Australia